Soldatenkov is a Ukrainian-language surname. Notable people with the surname include:

Aleksandr Soldatenkov, multiple persons
Aleksandr Soldatenkov (fencer)
Aleksandr Soldatenkov (footballer)

See also

Ukrainian-language surnames